Royals may refer to:

Entertainment 
 The Royals (band), a Jamaican reggae vocal group
 The Royals, original name of The Midnighters
 "Royals" (song), a 2013 single by Lorde
 "Royals" (Paul Rey song), a 2023 single by Paul Rey
 The Royals (TV series), a 2015 E! network drama series
 The Royals, a 1997 book by Kitty Kelley about the British royal family
 Royals, a 2017 Marvel Comics series about the Inhumans
 Royals, a book series by Rachel Hawkins
 Royals, the original publication title of Prince Charming, a 2018 novel in the series

Sports teams 
 Kansas City Royals, a Major League Baseball team
 Burlington Royals, a minor league baseball farm team of the Kansas City Royals
 Omaha Royals, former name of the Omaha Storm Chasers, a minor league baseball farm team of the Kansas City Royals
 Barbados Royals, a team in the Caribbean Premier League
 Barbados Royals (WCPL), a team in the Women's Caribbean Premier League
 Cincinnati Royals, a basketball team now known as the Sacramento Kings of the NBA
 Cornwall Royals, a defunct Canadian junior ice hockey team
 East Perth Football Club, an Australian rules football club nicknamed the Royals
 New Westminster Royals, the name of several hockey teams based in New Westminster, British Columbia
 Rajasthan Royals, an Indian Premier League cricket franchise
 Reading F.C., a football team in the Football League Championship
 Reading Royals, an ECHL ice hockey team based in Reading, Pennsylvania
 Royal AM F.C., a South African soccer team
 Royals Football Club, an Australian rules football club located in Albany, Western Australia
 Victoria Royals, a Western Hockey League team
 Busan Daewoo Royals, former name of South Korean football club Busan IPark
 A nickname for various sports teams from County Meath, Ireland

See also 

 Royal (disambiguation)
 Royale (disambiguation)